Indian Institute of Technology Gandhinagar (also known as IIT Gandhinagar or IITGN) is a public technical university located in Gandhinagar, Gujarat, India. It has been declared to be an Institute of National Importance by the Government of India. Established in 2008, IIT Gandhinagar campus is spread over 400 acres of land along the river Sabarmati.

History

Foundation 

IIT Gandhinagar is one of the eight Indian Institutes of Technology (IITs) announced by the Ministry of Human Resource Development in 2008. The institute began operating in a temporary campus at Vishwakarma Government Engineering College, Chandkheda, mentored by Indian Institute of Technology Bombay. The first batch of students was admitted to three programmes: Chemical Engineering, Mechanical Engineering, and Electrical Engineering.

IITGN was included in the Institutes of Technology (Amendment) Act, 2011. The Act was passed in the Lok Sabha on 24 March 2011 and by the Rajya Sabha on 30 April 2012. The IIT Gandhinagar campus is located on the banks of the Sabarmati River in Palaj village. In 2011, in his inaugural speech at the Amalthea technology summit, then Gujarat Chief Minister Narendra Modi spoke of the land for the new permanent campus, saying, "the state government has decided to give land on 99 year lease with a token amount of just one rupee for setting up a campus of IIT-Gandhinagar." The institute took possession of over 400 acres of land in August 2012, and classes and other activities on the new campus began in July 2015.

The 400-acre campus of IITGN is situated on the banks of Sabarmati river in Palaj village. The campus has three rough divisions: Academic Block, Housing Block and Student Hostels. This campus is India's first 5-star GRIHA LD campus for minimizing the negative effect on the environment. IITGN has also been bestowed with FSSAI's 'Eat Right Campus' with a 5-star rating and is the first (and only) academic campus to be declared so.

Departments
 Biological Engineering
 Civil Engineering
 Chemical Engineering
 Computer Science and Engineering
 Electrical Engineering
 Mechanical Engineering
 Materials Engineering
 Chemistry
 Mathematics
 Physics 
 Cognitive Science
 Earth Sciences
 Humanities and Social Sciences

Centres 
 Archaeological Sciences
 Biomedical Engineering
 Design and Innovation
 Safety Engineering
 Cognitive and Brain Sciences
 Sustainable Development
 Center for Creative Learning

See also
 Indian Institutes of Technology

References

External links

 

Gandhinagar
Educational institutions established in 2008
Education in Gandhinagar
2008 establishments in Gujarat